Richard Molyneux (c. 1368 – 27 December 1397), of Sefton, Lancashire, was an English politician.

Family
Molyneux was the eldest son and heir of Sir William Molyneux of Sefton who died in 1372. His mother was Agnes Hoghton, daughter of MP Sir Adam Hoghton of Hoghton. Agnes was the widow of Sir Thomas Banaster. Molyneux's second wife was Ellen, daughter of MP, Sir Robert Urswyk, by whom he had two sons and one daughter.

Career
He was a Member (MP) of the Parliament of England for Lancashire in January 1397.

References

1368 births
Members of the Parliament of England (pre-1707) for Lancashire
1397 deaths
English MPs January 1397